Phytomyza aquilegiana, known generally as the "columbine leafminer", is a species of leaf miner fly in the family Agromyzidae.

References

Further reading

 Diptera.info
 NCBI Taxonomy Browser, Phytomyza aquilegiana
 

Phytomyza